Saint-Antoine-de-Tilly is a municipality in the Municipalité régionale de comté de Lotbinière in Quebec, Canada. It is part of the Chaudière-Appalaches region and the population is 1,462 as of 2009.

Member of the Most Beautiful Villages of Quebec, Saint-Antoine-de-Tilly has been colonized since the early beginnings of New France. The seigneurie of Villieu was sold in 1700 to Pierre-Noël Le Gardeur de Tilly, and because the seigneurie of Tilly, which is still part of the municipality's name today.

Saint-Antoine is named in honour to Catholic saint Anthony of Padua.

References

Commission de toponymie du Québec
Ministère des Affaires municipales, des Régions et de l'Occupation du territoire

Municipalities in Quebec
Incorporated places in Chaudière-Appalaches
Lotbinière Regional County Municipality
Canada geography articles needing translation from French Wikipedia